Muhammad ibn Thalib ibn Abd Allah ibn Ni`mat Allah ibn Sadr ad-Din ibn Shaykh Baha' ad-Din ash-Shirazi was a 15th-century Persian physician from Shiraz, Iran.
 
Muhammad ibn Thalib ash-Shirazi is known only by his extensive Arabic manual on diseases and "tested remedies" (mujarrabat). He composed it for an otherwise unknown person named al-Hasan ibn Abi Yahya ibn Barakat, whose name is mentioned in the title, which translates as "Useful Information for Hasan on Tested Medical Remedies". Only two copies are known, one at The National Library of Medicine, and one in Dublin; the latter was copied in 1715, and therefore the author must have lived prior to that time. 

Sommer states that Muhammad ibn Thalib Shirazi died in 1467.

See also

List of Iranian scientists

Sources

15th-century Iranian physicians
1467 deaths
Year of birth unknown
People from Shiraz